Hoop Dee Doo: It's a Wiggly Party is the thirteenth Wiggles album. It was released in 2001 by ABC Music distributed by EMI. It was nominated for the 2001 ARIA Music Award for Best Children's Album but lost to Hi-5's It's a Party. A video of the same title was released in 2001.

Track listing

Gallery

Charts

Certifications

Video

The video "Hoop-Dee-Doo: It's a Wiggly Party" was also released in 2001.

Song list
 "Wiggly Party"
 "Hoop-Dee-Doo"
 "Little Children"
 "Move Like an Emu"
 "La Cucaracha"
 "Captain's Magic Buttons"
 "Dance the Ooby-Doo (with Dorothy the Dinosaur)"
 "Play Your Guitar with Murray"
 "Marie's Wedding"
 "Zoological Gardens"
 "Swim Henry Swim"
 "Fun on the Farm"
 "Caveland"
 "Run Around Run Run"
 "The Wobbly Dance"
 "Wiggle Hula"

Cast

 The Wiggles are
 Murray Cook
 Jeff Fatt
 Anthony Field
 Greg Page

Additional cast
 Paul Paddick as Captain Feathersword
 Corrine O'Rafferty as Dorothy the Dinosaur
 Reem Hanwell as Henry the Octopus
 Andrew McCourt as Wags the Dog

Releases
 Australia: 19 June 2001
 America: 9 April 2002
 United Kingdom: 12 September 2005

References

External links

2001 albums
2001 video albums
The Wiggles albums
The Wiggles videos
Australian children's musical films